The 1947 Saint Louis Billikens football team was an American football team that represented Saint Louis University as a member of the Missouri Valley Conference during the 1947 college football season. In its eighth season under head coach Dukes Duford, the team compiled a 4–6 record (1–1 against MVC opponents), finished third in the conference, and was outscored by a total of 220 to 201. The team played its home games at Walsh Stadium in St. Louis, MO.

Schedule

References

Saint Louis
Saint Louis Billikens football seasons
Saint Louis Billikens football